Maad Saloum Fode N'Gouye Joof (in Gambian English; or Fode Juuf in Serer) was the last king of Saloum. He reigned as Maad Saloum from 1935 to 1969. His royal title Maad Saloum means King of Saloum in Serer.

His residence was at Guinguinéo. Like many of the Serer kings during their medieval dynastic history, Fode was a member of the noble Joof patriclan and the Guelwar matriclan—the two dynastic families who have reigned in Sine and Saloum for centuries. Both his parents were of Guelowar matrilineage. He was a member of the Keway Begay clan. Keway Begay  was one of three sisters whose maternal descendants reigned in Saloum for several centuries. Fode was the son of King of Saloum—Ndeneh Jogop Joof (Fr. Ndéné Diogop Diouf) and Lingeer Ngouye Ndour, the Queen of Saloum, later Queen Mother. On his paternal side, he was of the noble Joof family who have reigned in precolonial Senegambia since lamanic times. His father was from Diagnel where Fode was born. On his maternal side, he was from Selik which is the village of the male descendants of the founder of the Guelowar dynasty in Saloum—Maad Saloum Mbegan Ndour (reigned: 1493). Fode  was a veteran of World War I, an Officer of the Legion of Honor, and commander of the national order of merit. He was Chief of the cantons of Kolobane, Laghem, Ndoukoumane, Pakala and Mandakh, and eventually Chief of the province of Kahone. He was advisor to independent Senegal. His death in 1969—almost simultaneous with that of Maad a Sinig Mahecor Joof—the last Maad a Sinig (King of Sine), ended the reign of the great and noble Joof and Guelowar dynasties.

Other spelling
Fodé N'Gouye Diouf (Senegalese French variation)
Fodé Diouf
Fodé Ngouye Diouf
Fode Ngui Joof (Gambian English spelling variation)

See also
Maad Ndaah Njemeh Joof
Serer maternal clans
Faye family
Teigne
Kingdom of Baol

Notes and references

Bibliography
Ba, Abdou Bouri, Essai sur l’histoire du Saloum et du Rip (avant-propos par Charles Becker et Victor Martin), Bulletin de l'IFAN, tome 38, série B, numéro 4, octobre 1976.  pp. 10–11, 14, 27 
Klein, Martin A., Islam and Imperialism in Senegal: Sine-Saloum, 1847-1914, Leland Stanford Junior University (Edinburgh University Press) (1968), p. xv, 
Brigaud, Félix, Histoire du Sénégal: Des origines aux traités de protectorat, Volume 1, Éditions Clairafrique (1964), p. 35, 65-7
Sarr, Alioune, Histoire du Sine-Saloum (Sénégal). Introduction, bibliographie et notes par Charles Becker. Version légèrement remaniée par rapport à celle qui est parue en 1986–87, p. 233
Guid'A.O.F.: L'Afrique occidentale française cercle par cercle, Agence de distribution de presse (1953), p. 195
Seck, Mamadou Falla, Sur les pistes du Bas-Saalum, Centre africain d'animation et d'échanges culturels (1992), p. 104, 

Serer royalty
Joof family
Maad
1969 deaths
Monarchs